Victor Henry Augustus d'Arcy (30 June 1887 – 12 March 1961) was a British sprint runner who competed at the 1912 and 1920 Summer Olympics.

In 1912 d'Arcy was eliminated in the semifinals of both 100 m and 200 m events.

As a third leg in the British 4 × 100 m relay team, he won a gold medal, in spite of finishing second after United States in the semifinal. United States was later disqualified for a fault in passing the baton, the same mistake was made in the final by world record holder and main favourite German team.

At the 1920 Summer Olympics, d'Arcy again reached the semifinals of the 100 m and also ran in the heats of the 200 m. He ran again the third leg in the British 4 × 100 m relay team which finished fourth. After the Games he moved to Rhodesia, where he lived until his death in 1961.

References

1887 births
1961 deaths
People from Rotherhithe
English male sprinters
Athletes (track and field) at the 1912 Summer Olympics
Athletes (track and field) at the 1920 Summer Olympics
Olympic athletes of Great Britain
English Olympic medallists
Olympic gold medallists for Great Britain
Medalists at the 1912 Summer Olympics
Olympic gold medalists in athletics (track and field)